M S Sheela is a Carnatic classical, light music and devotional singer. She is a AIR and Doordarshan artist in both classical and light music. She was awarded Sangeeta Nataka Academy award by the president of India in the year 2019.

Biography
M. S. Sheela got her initial musical guidance from her mother M. N. Rathna, a musician. later contiued learning Carnatic music under R. K. Srikantan.

Singing career
M S Sheela has sung for albums like 'Srividyadarshana' (compositions of Jayachamarajendra Wadiyar), 'Ninada' (compositions of Veene Sheshanna) and ′Sadashiva Madhurya′ (compositions of Mysore Sadashiv Rao) series produced by All India Radio, Bangalore.

Contributions to Indian Classical Music
Sheela and her husband through Hamsadhwani creations organise many music workshops, programmes by youth and seasoned musicians. An annual Hamsadhwani festival is also observed by Hamsadhwani creations. They also felicitate great achievers of the field through ′Hamsadhwani Puraskara′.

Awards and honours

 Sangita Kala Acharya from Madras Music Academy in 2019. 
 Rajyotsava Prashasti from  Government of Karnataka. 
 Ganakalashree by Ganakala Parishat 
 Chowdaiah Award by The Academy of Music

References

Women Carnatic singers
Carnatic singers
Recipients of the Sangeet Natak Akademi Award